Tatishchevsky District is an administrative and municipal district (raion), one of the thirty-eight in Saratov Oblast, Russia. It is located in the center of the oblast. Its administrative center is the urban locality (a work settlement) of Tatishchevo. Population: 28,405 (2010 Census);  The population of Tatishchevo accounts for 26.4% of the district's total population.

Military
The 60th Rocket Division of Strategic Missile Forces is based on the district's territory, as well as the Tatishchevo airbase, with 69 UR-100NUTTH and 40 Topol-M.

External links
Official website of Tatishchevsky District 
Official website of the Government of Saratov Oblast. Information about Tatishchevsky District

References

Notes

Sources

Districts of Saratov Oblast

